04 may refer to

 The year 2004, or any year ending with 04
 The month of April
 4 (number)
 04 (Six by Seven album)
 04 (Urban Zakapa album)
 04, department number of Alpes-de-Haute-Provence, France
 Several German football teams, e.g. Bayer 04 Leverkusen, FC Ingolstadt 04, 1. FC Neubrandenburg 04, FC Schalke 04

See also
O4 (disambiguation)